Trigonostigma is a genus of small cyprinid fish found in Southeast Asia. These social, colorful freshwater fish are often kept in aquariums.

Species
There are currently four recognized species in this genus:
 Trigonostigma espei (Meinken, 1967) (Lambchop rasbora)
 Trigonostigma hengeli (Meinken, 1956) (Glowlight rasbora)
 Trigonostigma heteromorpha (Duncker, 1904) (Harlequin rasbora)
 Trigonostigma somphongsi (Meinken, 1958) (Somphongs's rasbora)
 Trigonostigma truncata (Tan, 2020)

References

 
Taxa named by Maurice Kottelat